The 1945 Florida Gators football team represented the University of Florida during the 1945 college football season. The season was the fifth and last for Tom Lieb as the head coach of the Florida Gators football team. The 1945 backfield was made up entirely of freshmen.

Among the season's highlights was the Gators' 26–13 neutral site victory over the Ole Miss Rebels played in Jacksonville. The Gators also split a pair of games against teams from two U.S. military training bases. Lieb's 1945 Florida Gators finished with a 4–5–1 overall record and a 1–3–1 record in the Southeastern Conference (SEC), placing ninth among twelve SEC teams.

Schedule

Postseason
After Lieb's coaching contract was not renewed, he became the track & field coach and an assistant football coach at the University of Alabama, where his old Notre Dame teammate Frank Thomas was the head coach of the Alabama Crimson Tide.

References

Additional sources
 

Florida
Florida Gators football seasons
Florida Gators football